Madison County School District may refer to:
Madison County School District (Georgia)
Madison County School District (Mississippi)